Kamoliddin Murzoev (born 17 February 1987) is an Uzbekistani professional footballer who plays as a forward.

Career

He started his playing in Metallurg Bekabad in 2004. Murzoev played in Metallurg 3 seasons, after joying Dynamo Kyiv. He made 9 caps for Dynamo Kyiv, scoring one goal.

In 2011, he moved to Bunyodkor after one season played in Nasaf Qarshi. Murzoev had already played in Bunyodkor in 2009. In 2011–2013 he made 46 caps and scored 8 goals in League matches for Bunyodkor. On 23 June 2013 he signed a contract with 2012 Kazakhstan Premier League runner-up club Irtysh Pavlodar. Murzoev scored his first goal for the Kazakh side on 11 July 2013, in the 2:0 home win over Levski Sofia in a UEFA Europa League match. In February 2014, he joined Shakhter Karagandy, another leading Kazakh club. In February 2015, Murzoev returned to his home country, signing a contract with Uzbek League club Olmaliq.

References

External links 

1987 births
Living people
Uzbekistani footballers
Uzbekistan international footballers
Uzbekistani expatriate footballers
FC Bunyodkor players
FC Dynamo-2 Kyiv players
FC Irtysh Pavlodar players
FC Shakhter Karagandy players
FC AGMK players
Kazakhstan Premier League players
Footballers at the 2006 Asian Games
Expatriate footballers in Kazakhstan
Uzbekistani expatriate sportspeople in Kazakhstan
Place of birth missing (living people)
Association football forwards
Uzbekistan Super League players
Asian Games competitors for Uzbekistan